

li

lia-lid
liarozole (INN)
liatermin (INN)
libecillide (INN)
libenzapril (INN)
libivirumab (INN)
Librelease
Libritabs
Librium
licostinel (INN)
lidamidine (INN)
lidanserin (INN)
Lidex
lidimycin (INN)
lidocaine (INN)
Lidocaton
Lidoderm
lidofenin (INN)
lidoflazine (INN)
Lidopen
lidorestat (USAN)
Lidosite Topical System Kit

lif-lio
lifarizine (INN)
lifibrate (INN)
lifibrol (INN)
Lignospan
lilopristone (INN)
limaprost (INN)
limazocic (INN)
Limbitrol
linaclotide (INN)
linagliptin (INN)
linarotene (INN)
Lincocin (Pfizer)
lincomycin (INN)
linetastine (INN)
linezolid (INN)
linifanib (USAN, INN)
linogliride (INN)
linopirdine (INN)
linotroban (INN)
linsidomine (INN)
lintitript (INN)
lintopride (INN)
lintuzumab (INN)
Liothyronine Sodium
liothyronine (INN)

lip-lit
Lipidil
Lipitor (Pfizer)
Lipo Gantrisin
Lipo-Hepin
Liposyn
liprotamase (USAN)
Liquaemin
Liquamar
Liquid Pred
liraglutide (USAN)
liranaftate (INN)
lirequinil (INN)
lirexapride (INN)
liroldine (INN)
lisadimate (INN)
lisdexamfetamine dimesylate (USAN)
lisinopril (INN)
lisofylline (INN)
lisuride (INN)
litgenprostucel-L (USAN)
Lithane
Lithium Carbonate
Lithobid
Lithonate
Lithostat
Lithotabs
litoxetine (INN)
litracen (INN)
litronesib (USAN, INN)

liv-lix
livaraparin calcium (INN)
lividomycin (INN)
Livostin
lixazinone (INN)